Gauhati University, also known as GU, is a collegiate public state university located in Guwahati, Assam, India. It was established on 26 January 1948 under the provisions of an Act enacted by the Assam Legislative Assembly. It is the oldest university in Northeast India.

It is accredited grade "A" by National Assessment and Accreditation Council. Starting with 18 affiliated colleges and 8 Post Graduate Departments in 1948, Gauhati University, today, has 39 Post Graduate Departments, besides IDOL (Institute of Distance and Open Learning), a constituent Law and Engineering College. It has 341 affiliated colleges offering undergraduate and post graduate courses in the faculties of Arts, Science, Commerce, Law, Medicine, Engineering and Technology. Gauhati University is a member of the Association of Indian Universities and the Association of Commonwealth Universities.

History 

The first public demand was made at the annual session of the Assam Association held at Sivasagar in 1917. In 1940, the Government appointed S. K. Bhuyan as Special Officer with the task of collecting relevant information on the selection of site and related matters. The university was established by an act of the State Legislature: the Gauhati University Act 1947 (Assam Act, XVI of 1947) of the government of Assam in 1948. The first court meeting of the university was held on 26 January 1948, which is considered the foundation day, at the old Sudmerson Hall of Cotton College, Guwahati.

Gauhati University started functioning as an affiliating, teaching and residential university in a few temporary buildings in Guwahati, with K.K Handique as the first vice-chancellor, Phanidhar Dutta, Sailandhar Rajkhowa and Sarat Kumar Dutta were selected as the registrar, treasurer and secretary of university classes, respectively. The emblem of the university, selected from among many submitted, was designed by T. Mukherjee, a textile designer of Ahmedabad. Two Sanskrit words inscribed on it – Vidyaya Sadhayeta (meaning achievement through learning) – indicate the motto of the university. It had 17 affiliated colleges and eight Post Graduate Departments on its establishment. The university which started functioning from the city center was shifted to the present campus in 1955–56.

Campus 

The university is in Jalukbari in the Guwahati city area. The campus has a hillock on the southern side and the Brahmaputra river flows on the northern side. The campus area has been developed into a small township, now known as 'Gopinath Bardoloi Nagar'. It has about 6000 population including 3700 students residing in the hostels.

Apart from the residential quarters of teachers, officers and employees, there are 22 halls of residence for students. The necessary civic amenities such as health service, water supply, street lighting, internal roads, guest house, post and telegraph office, a branch of the State Bank of India, United Bank Of India, canteens, a market, parks, playgrounds, auditorium, indoor stadium, etc. are on campus.

The university is 10 km from the Lokpriya Gopinath Bordoloi International Airport on National Highway No. 37; 5 km from Kamakhya Railway Station; and 10 km from Guwahati Railway Station as well as from the bus stop near the Cachari (D.C. court) at the heart of Guwahati City. The capital complex of Assam at Dispur is 22  km from the university.  The university is easily accessible from the Guwahati city; Guwahati has road, rail and air links from all parts of the country. A large number of bus services from parts of Assam have their station at Adabari bus stand which is 2  km from the campus.

To automate their internal processes, Gauhati University has chosen Kalingasoft's flagship Education ERP solution, Greycells. This implementation has resulted in the complete automation of the university's academic, administrative and financial processes.

Library and regional center

The North Eastern Regional Centre (NERC) of the Indian Council of Historical Research (ICHR) is in the Gauhati University Central Library Extension Building. Along with Bangalore ICHR Regional Centre, this is the only regional centre in GU so far.

The university's Krishna Kanta Handique Library is a designated 'Manuscript Conservation Centre' (MCC) under the National Mission for Manuscripts established in 2003.

The library is the largest in Assam, holding about 850,000 books, magazines, and journals in its collection. It also hosts about 5,000 valuable priceless manuscripts, some more than 300 years old.

Organisation and administration

Governance 

The G.U. Court, the Executive Council and the Academic Council are the authorities of the university.

In 2019, Professor Pratap Jyoti Handique was appointed as the Vice-Chancellor of the university.

Faculties

Academic faculties
The institution is divided into following academic units:

 Faculty of Arts
 Arabic
 Assamese
 Bengali
 Bodo
 Communication and Journalism
 Disabilities Studies
 Economics
 Education
 English
 English Language Teaching
 Folklore
 Foreign Languages
 Hindi
 History
 Geography
 Library and Information Science
 Linguistics
 Modern Indian Languages (Odia, Tamil, Nepali)
 Persian
 Philosophy
 Political Science
 Philosophy
 Sanskrit
 Sociology
 Women’s Studies
 Faculty of Sciences
 Anthropology
 Botany
 Chemistry
 Environmental Science
 Geography
 Geological Sciences
 Mathematics
 Physics
 Statistics
 Zoology
 Faculty of Technology
 Biological Science
 Biotechnology
 Biotechnology and Bioengineering
 Chemical Science
 Computer Science
 Electronics and Communication Engineering
 Electronics and Communication Technology
 Information Technology
 Instrumentation and USIC
 Mathematical Science
 Physical Science
 Faculty of Commerce
 Commerce
 Faculty of Management
 Business Administration
 Faculty of Law
 Law

Post Graduate Students' Union
The Post Graduate Students' Union is the apex student representative body of Gauhati University. The first body of PGSU was formed in the year 1949. The first General Secretary was Biren Goswami. Gauhati University being the epicenter of student politics, the PGSU gets high recognition in the state. There are many General Secretaries as well as other office bearers of PGSU who have been involved in the active politics. The present General Secretary of PGSU is Parshwa Patgiri.

Colleges 

When Gauhati University was established, it had 17 affiliated colleges. Today it has 326 colleges in Assam which are affiliated to Gauhati University. This included Cotton College until it became a university. The affiliation of Cotton College was transferred from Calcutta University to Gauhati University after the later was established in 1948.

Academics

Rankings

Internationally, the QS World University Rankings ranked Gauhati University in the 601–650 band in Asia in 2023.

In India, the National Institutional Ranking Framework (NIRF) ranked Gauhati University 64 overall in 2022 and 36 among universities.

Affiliated colleges
Its jurisdiction extends over 15 districts -Bajali district, Barpeta, Biswanath, Bongaigaon, Darrang, Dhubri, Goalpara, Hojai, Kamrup Metropolitan, Kamrup district, Morigaon, Nagaon, Nalbari, Sonitpur, South Salmara district .

Notable people

Notable alumni

 Rafiqul Islam, MLA and former guest lecturer Gauhati University
 Dinesh Prasad Goala, Politician and former MLA of Lakhipur
 Ambika Charan Choudhury, litterateur
 Jitendra Nath Goswami, Indian scientist, chief scientist of Chandrayaan-1, Shanti Swarup Bhatnagar Laureate (1994), Padma Shri (2017)
 Bhabananda Deka, economist
 Zubeen Garg, Singer, Composer, Filmmaker, Director and Actor.
 Kashmiri Saikia Baruah, Actress and Singer.
 Mamoni Raisom Goswami, novelist, Sahitya Akademi Award (1983), Jnanpith Award (2001), Principal Prince Claus Laureate (2008)
 Dipak C. Jain, professor, European president at CEIBS
 Hitendra Nath Goswami, former Speaker of Assam Legislative Assembly
 Nagen Saikia, Indian writer, Sahitya Akademi Award (1997)
 Bijoya Chakravarty, politician, former Union Minister of State, Water Resources 
 Elangbam Nilakanta Singh, poet, Sahitya Akademi Award (1987), Padma Shri (2000)
 Ritu Lalit, Indian writer
 Sarbananda Sonowal, politician,current union minister, former chief minister of Assam
 Prafulla Kumar Mahanta, former chief minister of Assam
 Mukundakam Sharma, lawyer, former judge in the Supreme Court of India, former Chief Justice of Delhi High Court
 Temsula Ao, novelist, Padma Shri (2007), Sahitya Akademi Award (2013)
 Atul Bora, politician
 Himanta Biswa Sarma, current Chief Minister of Assam
 Riniki Bhuyan Sharma, lawyer and entrepreneur.
 Ramkrishna Ghosh, politician
 Ardhendu Kumar Dey, politician
 Adv.Aminul Islam, Current MLA - 21 Mankachar Constituency, General Secretary. Org & Chief Spokesperson (AIUDF), Politician, Social Worker 
 Dhruba Hazarika, novelist
 Siddhartha Bhattacharya, politician
 Nirmal Prabha Bordoloi, novelist, Sahitya Akademi Award (1983)
 Arupa Kalita Patangia, novelist, Sahitya Akademi Award (2014)
 Bhupendra Nath Goswami, Indian scientist, Shanti Swarup Bhatnagar Laureate (1995)
 Mahim Bora, Indian writer, Sahitya Akademi Award (2001), Padma Shri (2011)
 Tarun Gogoi, former Chief Minister of Assam
 Harishankar Brahma, 19th Chief Election Commissioner of India
 Birendra Nath Datta, Indian researcher, Padma Shri (2009)
 Debapratim Purkayastha, Indian educator
 Kishore Jadav, writer

Notable faculty
Debo Prasad Barooah, former vice-chancellor
Surya Kumar Bhuyan, former vice-chancellor
Amarjyoti Choudhury, former lecturer
Krishna Kanta Handique, founder vice-chancellor of Gauhati University, Padma shri(1955), Padma Bhushan(1967)
Bhupen Hazarika, former lecturer
Banikanta Kakati, former dean of Faculty of Arts and head of the Assamese Department.
Jyotiprasad Medhi, former head and professor of statistics department.
Maheswar Neog, former professor
N. U. Prabhu, former lecturer
Bhabendra Nath Saikia, former lecturer

List of Vice-Chancellors

 Krishna Kanta Handique (23-02-1947 to 22-02-1957)
 Surya Kumar Bhuyan (23-02-1957 to 22-02-1960)
 H. C. Bhuyan (23-02-1960 to 12-03-1962)
 Phanidhar Dutta (13-03-1962 to 21-08-1962)
 Harold John Taylor (06-09-1962 to 13-05-1965)
 M. N. Goswami (17-05-1965 to 16-05-1971)
 S. C. Rajkhowa (17-05-1971 to 13-04-1974)
 H. K. Barua (14-07-1974 to 14-07-1979)
 J. M. Choudhury (15-07-1979 to 09-01-1986)
 D. P. Barooah (27-01-1986 to 26-01-1991)
 N. K. Choudhury (27-01-1991 to 13-02-1996)
 Hiralal Duarah (14-02-1996 to 11-11-2001)
 G. N. Talukdar (12-11-2001 to 12-11-2006)
 Amarjyoti Choudhury (13-11-2006 to 10-05-2008)
 Okhil Kumar Medhi (19-05-2008 to 18-08-2013)
 Mridul Hazarika (19-08-2013 to 20-08-2019)
 Pratap Jyoti Handique (21-08-2019 to present)

See also
 List of colleges affiliated to Gauhati University

References

External links
 

 
Universities in Assam
Universities and colleges in Guwahati
Educational institutions established in 1948
1948 establishments in India